Aynurbimakhi (Dargwa: ГӀяйнурбимахьи) is a rural locality (a selo) in Nizhnemulebkinsky Selsoviet, Sergokalinsky District, Republic of Dagestan, Russia. The population was 290 as of 2010. There is 1 street.

Geography 
Aynurbimakhi is located 32 km south of Sergokala (the district's administrative centre) by road, on the Garmiozen river. Burkhimakhi and Bakhmakhi are the nearest rural localities.

Nationalities 
Dargins live there.

References 

Rural localities in Sergokalinsky District